Goodrich Township is a township in Crawford County, Iowa, USA.  As of the 2000 census, its population was 315.

The township is named after Isaac B. Goodrich, a pioneer settler.

Geography

The streams of Bear Creek, Big Creek and Buffalo Creek run through this township.

References

 USGS Geographic Names Information System (GNIS)

External links
 US-Counties.com
 City-Data.com

Townships in Crawford County, Iowa
Townships in Iowa